Thomas Gale (12 October 1895 – 1976) was an English footballer who played for Barnsley and Stockport County.

References

1895 births
1976 deaths
English footballers
Association football goalkeepers
English Football League players
Barnsley F.C. players
Stockport County F.C. players